Bad Monkey is an album released by American blues artist Iron Mike Norton.  It was released May 7, 2012, on GFO Records and distributed by INgrooves. It is considered the cornerstone album for Norton, establishing his signature "swamp stomp" style of blues.

Production
Bad Monkey was recorded at The Gutbuckit in Gainesville, Missouri, and produced by Iron Mike Norton.

The song"Whiskey And Wine (live)" was recorded live at Simple Man's in Mountain Home, Arkansas.

Track listing

Personnel

Musicians
Iron Mike Norton – Slide guitar (all tracks), Guitar (all tracks except 6), Dobro (track 10), vocals (all tracks), Bass guitar (tracks 4 & 8). Drums (all tracks), Roland TR-808 (tracks 1, 3, and 7)

Production
Iron Mike Norton – producer, mixing engineer

External links
 Bad Monkey at Iron Mike Norton Official Website
 Bad Monkey of Discgos
 Bad Monkey on Musicbrainz
 Bad monkey lyrics on Musixmatch

References

2012 albums
Iron Mike Norton albums
Roots rock albums